Lucius Caecilius Metellus Calvus (c. 200 BC or before 178 BC – after 136 BC) was a Roman statesman. He was a son of Quintus Caecilius Metellus and brother of Quintus Caecilius Metellus Macedonicus. First Calvus used to be a Praetor, later a Consul and Governor of Hispania in 142 BC, where he fought, without success, against Viriathus, then he became a Proconsul of Cisalpine Gaul in 141 BC, and from 140 BC to 139 he was a Legate. Also during those years, Calvus participated in an embassy to some Eastern states.

Children
Calvus' children were:
 Lucius Caecilius Metellus Dalmaticus
 Quintus Caecilius Metellus Numidicus
 Caecilia Metella, wife of Lucius Licinius Lucullus, son of Lucius Licinius Lucullus

See also
 Caecilia gens

Notes

2nd-century BC births
2nd-century BC deaths
2nd-century BC Roman consuls
Ancient Roman governors
Calvus, Lucius
Roman Republican praetors
Year of birth uncertain
Year of death uncertain